Lance Travis (born June 21, 1969) is an American former pair skater. With partner Stephanie Stiegler, he was the U.S. junior champion in 1993 and the bronze medalist at the United States Figure Skating Championships in 1995. He later teamed with Sara Ward and finished fifth at nationals in 1996.

Lance Travis currently works as a coach in Greensboro, North Carolina.

Results 
(with Stiegler)

References

American male pair skaters
1969 births
Living people
Competitors at the 1994 Goodwill Games